Absadah was a priest and martyr of the early 4th century, who is venerated as a Saint in the Catholic church. He suffered martyrdom in the Diocletianic persecution.

Life
Absadah was born near Behnesa, Egypt,  300. He was a priest to a small congregation in his village. Upon the start of the Diocletian Persecution, Absadah barricaded himself in his home, planning to hide from persecution. Later, he recounted a vision of Jesus Christ appearing before him. He voluntarily came before the court, and was sent to Alexandria.

Absadah was sentenced to be burnt alive; however, he was beheaded outside the walls of the city. He was buried at Cairo.

Sainthood
The Catholic Church commemorates Absadah as a saint, with a feast day of January 19.

References

Sources
Absadah at Catholic Online

Year of birth missing
Egyptian Christian clergy
4th-century Christian martyrs
4th-century Christian clergy
4th-century Romans
Christians martyred during the reign of Diocletian